The Lincoln Building is a historic commercial building at 1423-25 South Main Street in Little Rock, Arkansas.  It is a two-story brick structure, built in 1905 with modest Neoclassical design elements, including bays articulated by brick pilasters with metal Corinthian capitals. It was built as a speculative real estate venture by C. J. Lincoln, a local drugstore wholesaler, and is one of the South Main Street area's best examples of the style.

The building was listed on the National Register of Historic Places in 1994.

See also
National Register of Historic Places listings in Little Rock, Arkansas

References

Commercial buildings on the National Register of Historic Places in Arkansas
Neoclassical architecture in Arkansas
Buildings and structures in Little Rock, Arkansas
National Register of Historic Places in Little Rock, Arkansas
Historic district contributing properties in Arkansas
Commercial buildings completed in 1905
1905 establishments in Arkansas